Lee Phelps (born Napoleon Bonaparte Kukuck; May 15, 1893 – March 19, 1953) was an American film actor. He appeared in more than 600 films between 1917 and 1953, mainly in uncredited roles. He also appeared in three films that won the Academy Award for Best Picture (Grand Hotel, You Can't Take It with You, and Gone with the Wind).

Phelps appeared in the 1952 episode "Outlaw's Paradise" as a judge in the syndicated western television series, The Adventures of Kit Carson, starring Bill Williams in the title role. He also appeared in a 1952 TV episode (#90) of The Lone Ranger.

Selected filmography

 The Fuel of Life (1917)
 Limousine Life (1918)
 False Ambition (1918) as Peter van Dixon
 The Secret Code (1918)
 The Little Shepherd of Kingdom Come (1920)
 The Freshie (1922)
 Baby Clothes (1926)
 Putting Pants on Philip (1927)
 Anna Christie (1930) as Larry
 The Divorcee (1930)
 Danger Lights (1930)
 Paid (1930)
 No Limit (1931)
 Strangers May Kiss (1931)
 The Last Parade (1931)
 The Champ (1931)
 Vanity Street (1932)
 Bedtime Worries (1933)
 Transatlantic Merry-Go-Round (1934)
 Among the Missing (1934)
 The Boss Rider of Gun Creek (1936)
 The Magnificent Brute (1936)
 Palm Springs (off screen credit) (1936)
 Raw Timber (1937)
 Under Suspicion (1937)
 The Gladiator (1938)
 Female Fugitive  (1938)
 Boys' Reformatory (1939)
 The Roaring Twenties (1939) as Bailiff (uncredited)
 Kid Nightingale (1939)
 War Dogs (1942)
 Saboteur (1942) - Plant Security Officer (uncredited)
 Girls of the Big House (1945)
 Gun Law Justice (1949)
 Timber Fury (1950)
 Desperadoes of the West (1953)

References

External links

1893 births
1953 deaths
American male film actors
American male silent film actors
Male actors from Philadelphia
20th-century American male actors